The River Ash may refer to:-

The River Ash tree (Fraxinus pennsylvanica).
River Ash, Hertfordshire
River Ash, Surrey